The May 1957 Central Plains tornado outbreak sequence was a tornado outbreak sequence that took place across the US Central Plains from May 19 to May 21, 1957. The most destructive tornado of the outbreak was rated at F5, the highest level, and is often called the Ruskin Heights tornado. The worst of the damage occurred in Ruskin Heights, a suburb and housing development south of Kansas City, Missouri. A total of 57 tornadoes were reported from Colorado to the Mississippi Valley and 59 people were killed during the outbreak, including 44 in the Ruskin Heights tornado.

Background

Confirmed tornadoes

May 19 event

May 20 event

May 21 event

Williamsburg−Spring Hill, Kansas/Ruskin Heights–Raytown, Missouri

This violent, long-tracked, multiple vortex F5 tornado began near Williamsburg, and moved NE through several counties. Major damage occurred in rural areas near Ottawa and Spring Hill, where homes were completely leveled and several fatalities occurred. The tornado continued into the southern suburbs of Kansas City, tearing through Martin City, Raytown, Hickman Mills, and Ruskin Heights. Entire blocks of homes were completely leveled, many of which were swept cleanly away with debris wind-rowed long distances through nearby fields. Some homes had their anchor-bolted subflooring ripped away, leaving only basements behind. Many businesses including a grocery store, a shopping center, and restaurants were completely destroyed. A few of the businesses at the shopping center sustained F5 damage. Vehicles were thrown through the air and destroyed, and the steel-reinforced Ruskin Heights High School was badly damaged. A canceled check from Hickman Mills was found 165 miles away in Ottumwa, Iowa. This event might have been a tornado family rather than a single tornado, as there was possible break in the damage path south of Wellsville, Kansas. Grazulis rated the tornado an F4, but said probable F5 damage occurred in Ruskin Heights; he subsequently rated the tornado F5.

See also
List of North American tornadoes and tornado outbreaks
List of F5 and EF5 tornadoes

References

Bibliography
 Caught in the Path, by Carolyn Glenn Brewer.

Notes

External links
 Ruskin Heights Tornado website
 NOAA page of Carter County, Missouri tornado

F5 tornadoes
Tornadoes of 1957
Tornadoes in Kansas
Tornadoes in Missouri
1957 natural disasters in the United States
May 1957 events in the United States